Petrophile squamata is a species of flowering plant in the family Proteaceae and is endemic to southwestern Western Australia. It is a shrub usually with deeply divided, three-lobed and sharply-pointed leaves, and oval heads of hairy yellow or creamy-yellow flowers.

Description

Taxonomy
Petrophile squamata was first formally described in 1810 by Robert Brown in Transactions of the Linnean Society of London. The specific epithet (squamata) means "scaly", referring to the involucral bracts.

Distribution and habitat
Petrophile squamata is a common and widespread species growing in sandy heath, shrubland or woodland between Perth and Israelite Bay.

Conservation status
This petrophile is classified as "not threatened" by the Western Australian Government Department of Parks and Wildlife.

References

squamata
Eudicots of Western Australia
Endemic flora of Western Australia
Plants described in 1810
Taxa named by Robert Brown (botanist, born 1773)